Muhammad Yusuf Kandhlawi (1917-1965) was an Indian Islamic scholar who became the second ameer of the Tablighi Jamaat.

Biography
He graduated at the age of 20, in 1936 (1355 AH).

Muhammad Yusuf memorized the Quran at the age of ten, from Hafiz Imam Khan Mewati. Syed Ahmad Faizabadi, the elder brother of Syed Husain Ahmad Madani, sent an honorary degree to Yusuf commemorating his memorization of the Quran.

He died in Lahore in 1965,  at the age of 48. His funeral at Delhi was attended by at least two hundred thousand mourners.
His funeral prayer was led by Muhammad Zakariya Kandhlawi and was buried next to the grave of his father Muhammad Ilyas Kandhlawi.

Literary works

References

External links
 Bayans or speeches in Urdu language of Muhammad Yusuf Kandhlawi
 9,000 Tablighi Jamaat members quarantined
 Quran - An Article To Throw More Light

1917 births
1965 deaths
Indian Sunni Muslim scholars of Islam
20th-century Muslim scholars of Islam
Deobandis
Tablighi Jamaat people
Mazahir Uloom alumni
People from Shamli district
Emirs of Tablighi Jamaat